An L17 ribosomal protein leader is  a  ribosomal protein leader involved in ribosome biogenesis. It is used as an autoregulatory mechanism to control the concentration of the ribosomal protein L17. Known Examples were predicted in Actinomycetota and Pseudomonadota with bioinformatic approaches. The structure is located in the 5′ untranslated regions of mRNAs encoding ribosomal protein L17 (rplQ).

See also 
Ribosomal protein leader

References

External links 
 

Ribosomal protein leader